Quechua is one of the eight Natural Regions of Peru and is between 2,300 and 3,500 m above sea level. It is composed of big valleys divided by rivers fed by estival rains.

Its flora includes Andean alder, gongapa, and arracacha. People who live in this region, cultivate corn, squash, passionfruit, papaya, wheat, and peach.

Notable fauna include birds like the chihuanco or white-necked thrush.

Overview 
Andean Continental Divide

Mountain Top:

 Mountain passes - 4,100 m   
 Puna grassland  
 Andean-alpine desert  
 Snow line - about 5,000 m  
 Janca - Rocks, Snow and Ice     
 Peak

See also
 Climate zones by altitude
 Altitudinal zonation

Literature 

Montane ecology
Physiographic regions of Peru
Tropical Andes